Teretia hoisaeteri is a species of sea snail, a marine gastropod mollusk in the family Raphitomidae.

Description
The length of the shell attains 5.5 mm.

Distribution
This marine species occurs off Angola.

References

 Horro J. & Rolán E. (2017). Two new species of Teretia (Gastropoda: Raphitomidae) from West Africa. Iberus. 35(2): 143-157 page(s): 148, figs 4A-G, 5A-C

External links
 Gastropods.com: Teretia hoisaeteri

Endemic fauna of Angola
hoisaeteri
Gastropods described in 2017